Nat Cassidy (born September 25, 1981) is an American actor, writer, and musician based out of New York City, New York, United States.  He grew up in Phoenix, Arizona and attended Horizon High School, after which he received his BFA at the University of Arizona.

Career

Actor 
Cassidy has appeared as an actor in numerous Off- and Off-Off-Broadway productions. He has also appeared in film, television, and web projects, including the acclaimed webseries High Maintenance. In 2013, Cassidy starred in the independent horror-comedy film They Will Outlive Us All, which won numerous awards throughout the festival circuit, including winning Cassidy Best Actor in Chicago's Route 66 International Film Festival. Ain't It Cool News said of Cassidy's performance that he is "talented enough to carry this entire film." Also in 2013, he was nominated for a New York Innovative Theatre Award for Outstanding Solo Performance, for the one-man play Generic Magic Realism, by Edmond Malin.
Cassidy was inducted into the Indie Theater Hall of Fame for his contributions to the NY independent theatre scene, and was described as "an actor, director, and playwright of surprising range and depth."

In 2017, Cassidy joined fellow New York independent theatre artists Mac Rogers, Jordana Williams, and Sean Williams to form Gideon Media, a company dedicated to producing "complex, riveting genre entertainment, centered on pulse-pounding tales of science fiction and horror." Along with the new podcast imprint Tor Labs (an imprint of Tor Books), Gideon Media produced their debut podcast, the acclaimed serialized sci-fi noir drama Steal the Stars (written by Rogers). Nat performed the role of xenobiologist Lloyd, as well as wrote the novelization of the podcast, which is published by Tor Books.

Writer
Cassidy has a reputation for writing "darkly comic plays with one foot in horror and the other in literary allusion," and often feature historical characters. NYTheatre.com called him "a seismic talent" and the theater podcast Maxamoo described him as "one of the hottest young playwrights in" New York City.

His playscripts have been about, among other things, Shakespeare, Charles Lamb and Mary Lamb, H.P. Lovecraft, nuclear mutation, President Franklin Pierce, zombies, Dostoevsky, Nazi Germany, and genital warts.

In 2009, Cassidy's "metaphysical buddy comedy" about an imagined relationship between Christopher Marlowe and Caligula, The Reckoning of Kit & Little Boots, was nominated for three New York Innovative Theatre Awards and took home the award for Outstanding Full-Length Script. His play Any Day Now was also nominated for two NY IT Awards that same year, and took home Outstanding Actress in a Lead Role (Elyse Mirto). In 2011, his Lovecraft-inspired one-man show, I Am Providence or, All I Really Needed to Know about the Stygian Nightmare into Which Mankind Will Inevitably Be Devoured, Its Fruitless Screams of Agony Resounding in the Unending Chasm of Indifferent Space as It Is Digested by Squamous and Eldritch Horrors beyond Comprehension for All of Eternity, I Learned from Howard Phillips Lovecraft, won the NY IT Award for Outstanding Solo Performance. In 2014, his play Old Familiar Faces was nominated for four NYIT Awards, including Outstanding Full-Length Script, Outstanding Ensemble, Outstanding Lead Actor, and Outstanding Lead Actress. In 2015, his play The Temple, or, Lebensraum, another Lovecraft-inspired play set during Black May, was nominated for seven NYIT Awards, including Outstanding Full-Length Script, Outstanding Production, Outstanding Actor in a Lead Role (which Matthew Trumbull, the play's lead, won), Outstanding Sound Design (which its sound designer, Jeanne Travis, won), Outstanding Lighting Design, Outstanding Costume Design, and Outstanding Scenic Design.

In 2012, Cassidy was one of four librettists commissioned by The Kennedy Center/Washington National Opera in the first-ever American Opera Initiative. With composer Scott Perkins, he wrote the short opera "Charon," a loose adaptation of a story fragment by Lord Dunsany, which the Washington Times called "remarkable," "brilliant," and that "Mr. Cassidy’s libretto is what any composer could want."
His work has been produced mainly in New York City, but has also seen productions across the country, including Oklahoma, Wisconsin, and Chicago
His plays have been published by Samuel French, Broadway Play Publishing, New York Theater Experience, Smith & Kraus, Applause Books, and Indie Theater Now.

Nat's debut novel, a novelization of the hit podcast Steal the Stars was published on November 7, 2017, by Tor Books and named one of the "best new books of November 2017" by the Chicago Review of Books.

Appearances

Television

Film
 They Will Outlive Us All
 The Moose Head Over the Mantle
 Android Insurrection
 Total Retribution
 Battle: New York, Day 2

Off-Broadway and independent theatre
 Hamlet (Hamlet)
 King Kirby (as Stan Lee), by Fred Van Lente
 The Runner Stumbles
 Lickspittles, Buttonholers, and Damned Pernicious Go-Betweens
 As You Like It
 Honey Fist
 The Rise and Fall of Miles & Milo
 Good

Scripts

Full-length
 Any Day Now
 The Reckoning of Kit & Little Boots
 The Temple, or, Lebensraum, loosely inspired by an H. P. Lovecraft story
 Tenants, or, When the Hornet Arrives
 The Eternal Husband
 Old Familiar Faces
 I Am Providence or, All I Really Needed to Know about the Stygian Nightmare into Which Mankind Will Inevitably Be Devoured, Its Fruitless Screams of Agony Resounding in the Unending Chasm of Indifferent Space as It Is Digested by Squamous and Eldritch Horrors beyond Comprehension for All of Eternity, I Learned from Howard Phillips Lovecraft
 Goldsboro
 Pierce
 Songs of Love: A Theatrical Mixtape
 The Blood Brothers Present Bedlam Nightmares

Short plays
 Generation
 Roosterbrood
 Joy Junction
 Sparks Will Fly (a song cycle)
 All in Good Fun (a song cycle)
 Into the Life of Things
 Charon (libretto)

Novels 
 Steal the Stars (a novelization of the podcast by Mac Rogers), Tor Books, 
 Mary, Tor Books, ISBN 9781250265234

References

External links

 Personal website
 

1981 births
American male film actors
American male stage actors
Living people